Semen Paliy (c. 1645 – 1710) was a Ukrainian Cossack polkovnyk (colonel). Born in Chernihiv region,  Paliy settled in Zaporizhian Sich at a very young age and gained fame as a brave fighter and Zaporozhian Cossack.

In 1685 Paliy moved to Right-bank Ukraine and joined the service of Polish–Lithuanian Commonwealth king Jan Sobieski. During his years in Polish service, Paliy proved himself as an able Cossack commander in wars against Crimean Tatars and Ottoman Turks. Among other military deeds his men successfully raided the Turkish fortress of Ochakov and participated in the Battle of Vienna. He became the ataman of Right-bank Ukraine, still under Polish control (where the left-bank was under Russian control).

In the 1690s Semen Paliy, however, became wary of Polish overlordship of Ukraine and sent several requests to Moscow asking the Russians to help him free right-bank Ukraine from Poland.

In 1699 a new Polish king Augustus II disbanded the Cossack militia and signed a peace treaty with Ottoman Turkey. Cossacks were angered by this situation, and in 1702 Paliy started an open rebellion against the crown, the last of the major Cossack uprisings against the Commonwealth. Together with a number of other Cossack polkovnyks, Paliy and his rebels captured Bila Tserkva, Fastiv, Nemirov and a few other towns. Rebellious Cossacks massacred their traditional enemies - Polish szlachta, Catholic priests and Jews - in the area they controlled. On October 17, 1702 Paliy and his Cossacks were defeated by the Polish army near the town of Berdychiv and later at Nemirov and at Werbicham  in February 1703. Paliy's last stand was at Bila Tserkva.

Russian Tsar Peter I and left-bank Ukraine ataman Ivan Mazepa, who were allied with Poland against Sweden at the time, ordered Paliy to surrender Bila Tserkva, but he and his men refused.

Mazepa convinced Russian Tsar Peter I to allow him to intervene, which he successfully did, taking over major portions of right-bank Ukraine, while Poland was weakened by the invasion of Swedish king Charles XII. Fearing the popularity of Paliy, Mazepa had him exiled to Siberia in 1705.

In 1709 after Mazepa switched sides and joined the Swedes against Russia, Paliy together with other enemies of Mazepa was freed from exile. During the Battle of Poltava he fought against Mazepa and Charles XII in the ranks of Cossacks loyal to Russia.

After his death Paliy became a folk hero of many Ukrainian songs and legends. A church in the city of Fastiv (still preserved) was named Tserkva Paliya after him.

Semen Paliy is portrayed in later fictional literature describing his times, most notably in the Cossack series by Volodymyr Malyk.

References

 Brockhaus-Efron entry

1640s births
1710 deaths
People from Borzna
Zaporozhian Cossacks
Cossack rebels
National University of Kyiv-Mohyla Academy alumni
Ukrainian exiles in the Russian Empire